Cowdale may refer to:

Cowdale, hamlet within King Sterndale
John Cowdale, MP for Carlisle